Let the Transmitting Begin EP is the debut EP by metal band Sikth. It was originally released 2002 in the UK then re-released in Japan 2004 with extra tracks. The second CD of the UK pressing was recorded live for Mary Anne Hobbs' BBC Radio One Rock Show.

Track listing

References

2002 debut EPs
Sikth albums
Gut Records albums